The  1968 Kansas City Chiefs season was the 9th season for the Kansas City Chiefs as a professional AFL franchise; They finished with a 12–2 record, resulting in a tie for first place in the AFL Western Division with the Oakland Raiders, before the Raiders won the championship in a tiebreaker playoff, defeating the Chiefs 41–6. 

The 1968 Chiefs boasted one of the finest defenses ever assembled by the club, allowing an AFL record (and still franchise-low) 170 points, or 12.1 points per game. The nucleus of the defensive unit was clearly in its prime, producing six AFL All-Stars, including all three of the squad's linebackers.

Offensively, quarterback Len Dawson led the AFL in passing for the fourth time. Guard Ed Budde won the AFL Offensive Player of the Week award for the October 20 game against the Raiders. It was the first time the award was given to an interior lineman.

The Chiefs began the season with a 7–1 record and rattled off five straight victories to close the regular season at 12–2, sharing the division crown with the Raiders and setting up their playoff on December 22, in which the Raiders advanced to the AFL Championship Game against the New York Jets. The loss to Oakland was a major event in the Chiefs' rivalry with the Raiders, one of the NFL's most storied feuds.

Roster

Preseason

Regular season

Standings

Postseason

A tie in the Western Division standings necessitated an unscheduled playoff game

Schedule

Divisional Playoff

Oakland Raiders 41, Kansas City Chiefs 6
December 22, 1968, at Oakland–Alameda County Coliseum, Oakland, California

Scoring
OAK – Biletnikoff 24 pass from Lamonica (Blanda kick)
OAK – Wells 23 pass from Lamonica (Blanda kick)
OAK – Biletnikoff 44 pass from Lamonica (Blanda kick)
KC – Field goal Stenerud 10
KC – Field goal Stenerud 8
OAK – Biletnikoff 54 pass from Lamonica (Blanda kick)
OAK – Wells 35 pass from Lamonica (Blanda kick)
OAK – Field goal Blanda 41
OAK – Field goal Blanda 40

References

Kansas City Chiefs seasons
Kansas City Chiefs
Kansas